The Pegasus Award is the premier award for filk music and is annually hosted at the Ohio Valley Filk Fest (OVFF).

Awards
The Pegasus Awards were founded to recognize and honor excellence in filking. As science fiction (sci-fi) became better known and widespread within society in the 20th century as a distinct literary genre, many fans expressed themselves through works of music and art, including filking. The Pegasus Awards formally recognise filking or fan music as a fine lens that the sci-fi community shares with particular fiction-based cultural ideas.

Anyone with an interest in filk can nominate songs or individuals for the awards, and anyone can vote. It is not necessary to be a member of the convention to be involved in the nomination and voting process.

Currently awards are given in six categories: Best Song, Best Performer, Best Writer/Composer, Best Classic Song and two topical categories that vary from year to year. Some examples of past categories include: Best Love Song, Best Literature Song, Best Techie Song, Best Sing Along, etc.

The OVFF convention committee solicits nominations for finalists for the Pegasus Awards (the Nominating Ballot) during the late spring and summer. There is an opinion poll that runs during the year as well to help interested folk brainstorm ideas for the nominating ballot. The finalist ballot is distributed in the early fall, and must be returned by the opening night of OVFF. Voting can be done online—either to nominate finalists, or to vote for the finalists themselves. The final round of voting happens at OVFF itself, where handwritten ballots are collected after the annual Pegasus concert. The entire process is administered by the OVFF convention committee.

Ohio Valley Filk Fest

The Ohio Valley Filk Fest, (OVFF) is one of the largest filk music conventions. It is held annually in October in the Columbus, Ohio area, and the culmination of the event is the presentation of the Pegasus Award.

The first OVFF was held in 1984 in Cincinnati and was attended by about 80 people; it included the presentation of the first Pegasus Awards. After skipping 1985, it moved to the Columbus area but retained "Ohio Valley" in its name. The convention has been held every year since then, in various locations in Columbus. Recent conventions had been held in Dublin, Ohio, but as of 2010 the convention has moved to Worthington.

Lists of award winners
  *   Ties and joint winners

Best Performer

Best Writer/Composer

Song awards

Best Filk Song

Best Classic Filk Song

Topical categories

References

Further reading
 "A Decade of OVFF", in The Pegasus Winners: Volume I. M.A.S.S. F.I.L.C. 1994.

External links

 The Pegasus Award Winners
 Ohio Valley Filk Fest

Filk music
American music awards
Music of Ohio